William Wilkinson (born April 22, 1947) is a retired Canadian ice hockey coach. He coached the Wayne State Warriors men's ice hockey program for its entire 9-year existence at the Division I level. Prior to that, Wilkinson coach the Western Michigan for seventeen seasons.

Career
Wilkinson played for St. Lawrence for three years, leading the team in scoring as a sophomore and serving as the team captain in his senior season. After graduating in 1970 Wilkinson taught high school for a year before returning to Canton as an assistant coach for his alma mater.

Wilkinson served as an assistant for St. Lawrence for seven years, leaving to accept a similar position at North Dakota for one season. He spent a further three seasons as an assistant at Bowling Green under Jerry York before getting his first head coaching job at Western Michigan. After a poor showing in his first year the Broncos produced their first 20+ win season at the D-I level, earning Wilkinson the CCHA Coach of the Year. Two years later Wilkinson got the Broncos to surprising 32-win season, the program's only 30-win season (as of 2018), won the CCHA Tournament and reached the NCAA tournament for the first time. The team declined to a mediocre level for much of the next seven years before finally returning to the NCAA tournament in 1994. The Broncos made another trip to the playoffs two years later but remained winless in NCAA postseason play under Wilkinson.

During the 1998–99 season two of Wilkinson's players were arrested at a team party in a building that Wilkinson owned. An internal investigation was started and the entire team was subsequently suspended for violations of NCAA regulations. Wilkinson was eventually fired as head coach on February 3 but allowed to remain at the university as a special assistant to the AD. Once the season was over Wilkinson formally left and later took over as head coach for the newly-created program at Wayne State. The Warriors played as an independent for one season before joining the CHA. Wayne State produced a modest record their first season in conference but won both of their games in the CHA Tournament to earn Wilkinson his second conference championship. The Warriors followed that up by winning 20 games the next year, winning the CHA regular season title and claiming their second consecutive championship. With all of that team success Wilkinson was awarded with the CHA Coach of the Year. In 2003, with the NCAA tournament expanding to 16 teams, the CHA was to receive its first automatic bid and the two-time champions didn't disappoint, winning 20 games once more and claiming their third consecutive tournament championship. In the tournament Wayne State was set against the #2 overall seed Colorado College and, despite a valiant effort, could not overcome three power play goals from the Tigers.

After their three year run the Warriors declined sharply and never produced another winning record. In 2007 the university announced it was shuttering the men's team, citing a $500K annual operating cost coupled with no on-campus rink and a troubled economy.

Wilkinson continued to coach after Wayne State shut down, spending three seasons with CH Jaca and then a six-month stint with the Melbourne Mustangs before retiring.

Career statistics

Head Coaching Record

† Wilkinson was fired in the midst of an internal investigation into team activities.

See also
List of college men's ice hockey coaches with 400 wins

References

External links

1947 births
Canadian ice hockey centres
Canadian ice hockey coaches
Canadian ice hockey defencemen
Ice hockey people from Ontario
Living people
People from Huron County, Ontario
St. Lawrence Saints men's ice hockey players
Wayne State Warriors men's ice hockey coaches
Western Michigan Broncos ice hockey coaches